The Saint Peter Islands, also known as Saint Petra Islands or Petra Islands (Ostrova Petra) are two islands covered with tundra vegetation, shingle and ice. These islands, as well as some other islands nearby (Ostrova Andreia, Ostrov Pavla) were originally named after Christian Apostles. The climate is Arctic and severe with frequent blizzards in the winter. The sea surrounding these Islands is covered with fast ice most of the year and is obstructed by pack ice even in the summer, so that these islands are merged with the mainland and animals can go across the ice.

This island group belongs to the Krasnoyarsk Krai administrative division of Russia. 
None of these islands have had much historical importance, except for the fact that they are located very close to the Northern Sea Route.

Geography
The Saint Peter Islands are surrounded by narrow beach ridges and swales. They are located in the Laptev Sea coastal region, off the eastern shores of the Taymyr Peninsula, between Bukhta Marii Pronchishchevoy and Bukhta Faddeya.

The largest island is Ostrov Petr-Severnyy with a surface of 175 km². It is located very close to the coast, separated from it by a sound that is only 1.2 km wide in its narrowest point. The latitude of this island is 76° 40' N and its longitude 112° 25' E.
Ostrov Petr-Yuzhnyy is significantly smaller than its northern neighbor. It is located 9 km to the SW of Ostrov Petr-Severnyy and it is farther offshore. The latitude is 76° 20' N and its longitude 113° 15' E.
Other lesser islands in the Saint Peter group are Dozhdevoy, Vstrech, Bezymyannyy, Serpovidnyy and Kleshnya.

Other adjacent coastal islands
Saint Andrew Island (Остров Андрея; Ostrov Andreia) is an island of similar characteristics lying about 40 km further northwest along the coast. This island, Paul Island (Остров Павла; Ostrov Pavla) and Koshka Island (Остров Кошка; Ostrov Koshka), a neighboring long and narrow coastal island, are sometimes included as part of the same group, the Saint Andrew Islands (Острова Андрея; Ostrova Andreia). 
Vos'mogo Marta Island (Остров Восьмого Марта) is located only 8.5 km to the south of Petr-Yuzhnyy's SW end.
Psov Island (Остров Псов) is 4 km long and 3 km wide. It lies further down the coast, 43 km from Petr-Yuzhnyy's southeastern point.

See also
List of islands by area

References

External links
 Russian Polar Explorations
Northern Sea Route User Conference

Islands of the Laptev Sea
Islands of Krasnoyarsk Krai